The 2nd Golden Raspberry Awards were held on March 29, 1982, at an Oscar night potluck party to recognize the worst the film industry had to offer in 1981.

James Coco, nominated for worst supporting actor for his performance in Only When I Laugh, also received a nomination for the Academy Award for Best Supporting Actor for the same performance, a feat not repeated until double supporting actress nominee Amy Irving in 1984.

Winners and nominees

Films with multiple nominations 
These films received multiple nominations:

See also

1981 in film
54th Academy Awards
35th British Academy Film Awards
39th Golden Globe Awards
1981 Stinkers Bad Movie Awards

References

External links
Official summary of awards
Nomination and award listing  at the Internet Movie Database

Golden Raspberry Awards
02
Golden Raspberry Awards
Golden Raspberry Awards
Golden Raspberry